Omorgus monteithi is a species of hide beetle in the subfamily Omorginae.

References

monteithi
Beetles described in 1986